Aleksandra Szutenberg (born 15 October 1988) is a Polish rhythmic gymnast. She started gymnast training at the age of 6.

Results
 2002 – Polish Nationals (2)
 2002 – Polish Nationals in Team (1)

References

External links
 Her Club's homepage
 Profile at her Club's homepage

1988 births
Living people
Polish rhythmic gymnasts
Place of birth missing (living people)